Naval Base Borneo and Naval Base Dutch East Indies was a number of United States Navy Advance Bases and bases of the Australian Armed Forces in Borneo and Dutch East Indies during World War II. At the start of the war, the island was divided in two: British Borneo and Dutch East Indies. Both fell to the Empire of Japan, Japan occupied British Borneo and the Dutch East Indies in 1942 until 1945.

History

To the north, the US Naval Base Philippines fell to Japan before Borneo in 1941 and 1942, as such many US Navy ships and submarines escaped the Philippines and traveled south to ports in Borneo and the Dutch East Indies. On 25 November 1941 knowing that hostile Japan actions in the Pacific was coming, Admiral Hart, commander of the Asiatic Fleet, movef Destroyer Division (DesDiv) 57 (and Edsall) with the destroyer tender , to Balikpapan, Borneo, so the whole fleet would not be at Manila Bay in the Philippines. As Japan advanced south into Borneo these vessels fled further south to form the new US Naval Bases in Australia. Some of the Royal Netherlands Navy vessels, like Netherlands submarines: HMAS K9 and HNLMS K VIII, also fled to bases in Australia. With the American-British-Dutch-Australian Command (ABDACOM) the Allies tried to limit the advance of Japan. ABDACOM did not have enough troops or supplies to carry out the mission. Japan viewed the Dutch East Indies as a prize for its vast quantities of natural resources. In 1941, the Dutch East Indies was a major producer of: rubber, oil, quinine, coffee, tea, cacao, coconut, sugar, pepper, and tobacco. Due to Japan's aggression in China and other places, the US put an oil embargo on Japan.

During the Borneo campaign in 1944 and 1945 the Allies both built new bases and used captured Japan bases for staging advances in Borneo and the Philippines. Many ports and cities held by Japan did not surrender until the end of the war. As the Allies won more battles and moved in on Japan, Japan moved many of the 1942 Prisoners of war, mostly British and Australian in the 1945 Sandakan Death Marches. Like the Bataan Death March of 1942, many died in the Marches.

Dutch East Indies became independent from the Netherlands and Japan on 27 December  and is now the nation of Indonesia. British Borneo the northern parts of the island of Borneo, became the nation of Brunei on 1 January 1984 and parts became two states in Malaysia. For current base since 1949 see Indonesian Navy.

Naval Bases 
Naval Base Morotai, Major US Base opened September 1944, staging action in Philippines. Fleet Post Office # 936.
Base at Morotai supported: Wama Airfield and Pitu Airfield.
 Naval Base Sanga-Sanga, on Tawi-Tawi Island, support Sanga-Sanga Airfield           
 Naval Base Brunei Bay at Brunei Bay with Australian Army also to support Brunei Airfield
 Naval Base Tarakan at Tarakan with Australian forces, after Battle of Tarakan. Fleet Post Office # 1157
 Naval Base Balikpapan at Balikpapan, Fleet Post Office # 1156, use after fall of US Naval Bases in the Philippines retaken in June 1945 in the Battle of Balikpapan
Naval Base Batavia at Batavia, Java (now Jakarta )Fleet Post Office #1155 (lost March 1, 1942)
Naval Base Banjermassin at Banjarmasin, Borneo Fleet Post Office #1158 (lost in Battle of Banjarmasin)
Naval Base Samarinda, in 1942 ABDACOM operated from the port at Samarinda to support Samarinda Airfield
Naval Base Java, in 1942, the US set up a port to deliver planes and bombers to Yogyakarta Airfield as part of ABDACOM.
Naval Base Sourabaya at Sourabaya Java, Fleet Post Office # 3043 
Naval Base Tjilatjap, also called Naval Base Cilacap at Cilacap Java, in 1942 ABDACOM operated from the port at Tjilatjap. Base supported Pasiran Airfield. The USS Langley (CV-1) was sunk on her way to deliver more planes to Tjilatjap.
Saumlaki Seaplane Base in Saumlaki Bay used in 1942 by US Navy and Netherlands Naval Aviation. On Tanimbar Islands in Maluku province.
Naval Base Kudat at Kudat, British North Borneo, Fleet Post Office # 3103
Naval Base Kudat Brunei at Brunei, British North Borneo, Fleet Post Office # 3104 SF
Naval Base Ceram Island at Ceram Island, Fleet Post Office #  3135, support post war Boela Airfield, now Boela Airport
Naval Base Talaud Island on Talaud Islands Fleet Post Office # 3124, post war base (Operation Gossipmonger was canceled)
Naval Base Koepang at Koepang, Timor, Fleet Post Office # 3049, support post war Koepang Airfield 
Naval Base Manado at Manado, Celebes, Fleet Post Office # 3066, support post war Mapanget Airfield 
Naval Base Kendari at Kendari, Celebes leet Post Office # 3052, support post war Kendari Airfield
Australian bases, with US support:
Naval Base Sandakan, at Sandakan Borneo Fleet Post Office # 3128, freed July 1, 1945, support   Sandakan Airport
Naval base Labuan Island to support Timbalai Airfield, after Battle of Labuan
Naval Base Timor in Portuguese East Timor
Naval Base Muara Island after Battle of North Borneo
Naval Base Weston at Weston, Sabah, after Battle of North Borneo

Dutch East Indies Fleet 1942
The Netherlands had a fleet of vessels in Dutch East Indies in 1942, many were lost in the war and some fled to Australia. The fleet included: Light cruisers: HNLMS De Ruyter HNLMS Java and HNLMS Tromp. Destroyers: HNLMS Piet Hein, HNLMS Van Nes , HNLMS Van Ghent, HNLMS Kortenaer, HNLMS Banckert,
and HNLMS Witte de With. Eight minelayers and minesweepers. 
Light cruiser HNLMS Sumatra. K VIII-class submarine K-VII, K-VIII, K-IX, K-X, K-XI, K-XII, K-XIII, K-XIV, K-XVI, K XVIII and O-XIX. Gunboat: HNLMS Soerabaja and light cruiser: HNLMS Evertsen. Submarine tender Zuiderkruis. Major Dutch East Indies seaports included: Makassar, Tangerang, Batavia (Jakarta), Semarang Tegal and Surabaya.
The main base of the Dutch East Indies Fleet was at the Soerabaja Naval Base at Surabaya Java, supported by the Morokrembangan Seaplane Base with Dornier Do 24 seaplanes . Dutch Naval Base Tandjong Priok at Java was the main sub base.
The major Islands of the Dutch East Indies were:
Borneo, invaded January 1942, at Balikpapan, Tarakan, Samarinda 
Sumatra, was invaded February 1942
Java, was invaded February 1942 
Timor, was invaded February 1942
Koepang Seaplane Base on West Timor
Celebes, now Sulawesi, was invaded in January 1942 at Manado and Kendari
Lake Tondano Seaplane Base
East Nusa Tenggara and West Nusa Tenggara, invaded February 1942 
Maluku Islands, (Moluccas Islands was invaded in January 1942, including Ceram Island 
Dutch New Guinea in Western New Guinea, northern ports invaded, see US Naval Base New Guinea

British Borneo
British Borneo bases lost in the war and occupied by Japan included: Port of Sandakan, Port of Muara and Temburon. The British Pacific Fleet's East Indies Fleet also porting in nearby Singapore Naval Base. The British South Pacific Fleet joined the 1942 ABDACOM and many of the British ships were lost in the war. Some ships retreated to British bases in the Indian Ocean and other free British Western Pacific Territories.

POWs

As in other theaters of war Japan's treatment of POWs and civilians was very poor. Many were exhausted from hunger and disease. Many deaths were caused by the diversion of food, such as rice, to Japanese troops from the Dutch East Indies population. Between 4 and 10 million Indonesians from the Dutch East Indies were turned into Japan's forced labourers, called romusha. Four million died in the Dutch East Indies as a result of famine and forced labour.International Red Cross packages were not distributed to POWs. In the Dutch East Indies there were both massacres and executions of POWs:
Bangka Island massacre
Balikpapan massacre
Laha massacre
Rawagede massacre
Pontianak incidents
Sandakan Death Marches
Parit Sulong Massacre
Karoenga massacre on Tarakan Island in January 1942, coastal battery crew
Menado, Celebes Island, January 1942, executions of 12 POWs
Kertosono, Java Island, March 1942 executions of 9 POWs, Dutch marines
Tjiater, Java Island, March 6, 1942 executions of 72 POWs
Kalidjati Airfield massacre, Java Island, March 1942, British RAF ground personnel killed
Samarinda, Borneo Island, March 1942 at airfield Samarinda II 13 KNIL Army POWs shot 
Long Nawang, Borneo Island, August 1942 Japn executed many refugees in Kampong, including all crew members from a Glenn Martin bomber and three crew-members from Dornier seaplane.
Koetaradja II, Sumatra Island, March 1942, 56 POWs shot and dumped at sea.
Bireuen, Sumatra Island, March 1942, 18 POWs shot at bridge. Four escaped to tell about the 18.
Cargo ship Langkoeas lifeboats attacked by I-158
Tanker Augustina massacre, Western Java Sea, 1942, lifeboat machine-gunned, only 2 survived.

Gallery

See also
Operation Semut
Operation Agas
Operation Adder
Battle of Sunda Strait
Western New Guinea campaign
US Naval Advance Bases
List of Royal Australian Navy bases

External links
youtube, Australian World War Two History, Labuan Island, Borneo, Malaysia
youtube, Australians From Balikpapau (1945)
youtube, Borneo, Lesser known theaters of World War II
youtube, World War 2 – Defence of Australia

References

Naval Stations of the United States Navy
World War II airfields in the Pacific Ocean Theater
Airfields of the United States Navy
Military installations closed in the 1940s
Closed installations of the United States Navy
Indonesia in World War II
1944 in the Dutch East Indies
1945 in the Dutch East Indies